The Blue Danube is a 1928 American silent romantic drama film starring Leatrice Joy. This picture was produced by Cecil B. DeMille and directed by Paul Sloane with a distribution through Pathé Exchange.

Plot
A romance set in Austria before, during, and after World War I.

Cast
Leatrice Joy as Marguerite
Joseph Schildkraut as Ludwig
Nils Asther as Erich von Statzen
Seena Owen as Helena Boursch
Albert Gran as Herr Bourscch
Frank Reicher as Baron
May Robson
Edna Mae Cooper
Oliver Eckhardt as Fritz

Preservation
A print of The Blue Danube is preserved at the Library of Congress.

References

External links

Lantern slide for the film
Stills at the Nils Asther website

1928 films
American silent feature films
American romantic drama films
Films set in Austria
Films set in the 1910s
American black-and-white films
Pathé Exchange films
Films directed by Paul Sloane
1928 romantic drama films
1920s American films
Silent romantic drama films
Silent American drama films